The Belize national basketball team is the official national representative of Belize in international men's basketball, playing in the FIBA Americas division, and more specifically, within the Central American region.

Men
The men's team has little to no international experience. Its first major victory in international play came on home soil in the 1998 Caricom Men's Basketball Championship, held at the Civic Center in Belize City, Belize. Belize placed seventh of eight teams in the 1999 Centrobasquet Tournament in Havana after winning only one game despite playing close all the way. In a return engagement at the 2000 CARICOM Championship in Barbados, Belize placed fourth. Shortly after that, Belize moved to the Central American region and won the Central American Games championship in 2001. The team has failed to duplicate this success, most recently finishing with a 2 and 4 record in the 2006 COCABA Championship.

The team finished second in the 2009 COCABA tournament in Cancun, Mexico where it went 3–0 in group play despite allegations of fielding ineligible players. FIBA decided to treat the Belize National Team's games as unofficial and initially decided to disqualify them from the competition for having more than one naturalized citizen on their team. Belize won an appeal to the Court of Arbitration for Sport in April 2010, the players in question are Belizean by descent, not naturalization.

Belize won its opening match in the Centrobasquet Tournament, defeating Trinidad and Tobago, but lost badly to Mexico in a rematch of the COCABA final. A tough win over Cuba set Belize in a position to advance, but they fell to Puerto Rico in their final match and failed to qualify.

Current roster

At the 2010 Centrobasket: (last publicized squad)

|}

| valign="top" |

Head coach

Assistant coaches

Legend

Club – describes lastclub before the tournament
Age – describes ageon 5 July 2010

|}

Team members

Front L-R Darwin Carter, Milt Palacio, Darwin Leslie, Charlie Burgess, Leon Jacobs, Kenton Paulino Back L-R Coach Marques Johnson, Darren Bovel, Asst. Coach Alex Lloyd, Elsworth Itza, Alex Carcamo, Sonny Watson, Keenan Jourdon, Keith Acosta, Richard Troyer, Asst Coach Kevin Siroki, Thomas Shaw, Quinton Hamilton

Most recent games
 1st group match, Centrobasket: Belize 80–71 Trinidad and Tobago
 Final, 2009 COCABA Championship, Cancun, Mexico: Mexico 106–103 Belize
 Semifinal, 2009 COCABA Championship: Belize 99–75 Costa Rica
 3rd group match: Belize 92–88 Panama
 2nd group match: Belize 100–63 Guatemala
 1st group match: Belize 98–67 Nicaragua

International competitions

Olympics 
No appearances

FIBA World Cup
No appearances

FIBA AmeriCup
No appearances

Regional championships
 Centrobasket 2010: finished fourth in group
 Centrobasket 1999: 7th

CARICOM Men's Championships
 2000: 4th (in Barbados)
 1998: Champions (in Belize)

COCABA championships
 2009: 2nd
 2007: did not participate
 2006: 3rd
 2004: 7th
 2001: did not participate

References

Basketball in Belize
Men's national basketball teams
basketball